Homalopoma clippertonense is a species of small sea snail with calcareous opercula, a marine gastropod mollusk in the family Colloniidae.

Distribution
This marine species occurs off Baja California, Mexico; Clipperton Island; San Benedict Island.

References

External links
 To World Register of Marine Species
  K.L. Kaiser, The Recent Molluscan Fauna of Ile Clipperton; The Festivus XXXIX supplement, 2007

Colloniidae
Gastropods described in 1953